Soyuz TMA-17M was a 2015 flight to the International Space Station. It transported three members of the Expedition 44 crew to the International Space Station. TMA-17M was the 126th flight of a Soyuz spacecraft; the first having occurred in 1967. The crew consisted of a Russian commander accompanied by Japanese and American astronauts. The capsule remained docked to the space station for about five months until the scheduled departure of Expedition 45 in December 2015. Soyuz TMA-17M landed safely on the steppes of Kazakhstan on 11 December, 2015, in a rare night landing.

Crew

Backup crew

Mission Insigna
The mission patch for the mission is completely based on Apollo 17 insignia.

Gallery

See also

 2015 in spaceflight

References

Crewed Soyuz missions
Spacecraft launched in 2015
2015 in Russia
Spacecraft which reentered in 2015
Spacecraft launched by Soyuz-FG rockets
Fully civilian crewed orbital spaceflights